Melville is an affluent hamlet and census-designated place (CDP) in the Town of Huntington in Suffolk County on Long Island, New York. The population was 19,284 at the 2020 census.

History
The area was known to the Native Americans as Sunsquams. In the 17th century it was known as Samuel Ketcham's Valley, named for a local resident. Afterwards it was known as Sweet Hollow. This name was replaced by Melville in school records in 1854. There is some debate as to the origin of the Melville name. It may be derived from the Latin for honey (the area had an abundance of honey bees, and this may have also been the origin of the previous Sweet Hollow name). The author Herman Melville was being published around this time.

A Presbyterian church was built in Melville in 1829 at the corner of Old Country and Sweet Hollow Roads. In 1977 the church was moved  to the west. The church was in continuous use until 1930. It reopened in 1944 for the funeral of Edward Baylis and has been in use since then.

In 1909 a trolley line to Huntington was established. This was an extension of the Huntington Trolley Spur and went as far south as Amityville and had a connection to Babylon. There were six fare zones, one of which was the Duryea Farm at Melville. The line was shut down a decade later after farmers complained that noise from the trolley frightened their animals. Buses provided transportation after the trolley line closed. The growing use of private cars also reduced demand for the trolley line.

In the 1950s, Melville and its neighbors Dix Hills and  Wyandanch, along with the area known as Sweet Hollow, proposed to incorporate as a single village. The plans were unsuccessful.

Proposals were revived around 2001, when Melville, Dix Hills Wheatley Heights, and East Farmingdale (all within the school district) proposed incorporating as a single village. These plans also failed and each remain unincorporated hamlets to this day.

In May 2011, construction commenced for the replacement of the Northern State Parkway bridge over Route 110. The original bridge was 63 years old. The project was budgeted for $56,000,000 and was completed in 2014.

Melville is also home to one of New York Senator and Senate Minority Leader Chuck Schumer's nine home state offices.

In the past, Melville and some of its neighbors have unsuccessfully proposed incorporating as the Incorporated Village of Half Hollow Hills.

Geography
Melville is located at  (40.791593, −73.405439).

Melville lies directly east of the boundary with Nassau County.

Transportation

Road 
The Long Island Expressway (LIE) and Northern State Parkway, two of Long Island's busiest highways and major points of entry in and out of New York City, pass through Melville. Melville is located immediately off Exit 49 of the LIE. New York State Route 110 runs through the center of Melville.

Bus 
Melville's primary mode of public transit is the S1 bus run by Suffolk County Transit. S1 runs up and down Route 110 seven days a week and connects to two Long Island Railroad branches north and south of Melville. The "Suffolk Clipper" express bus service also serves the numerous business parks in South Melville during weekdays.

A park and ride/carpool parking lot with a bus shelter exists adjacent to the north of the LIE, but long-distance bus service to and from there is either highly occasional or nonexistent. The parking lot is still used by carpool commuters, but also attracts some illicit activity.

Rail 
Up until 1927 Melville was served by the Huntington Railroad's street car line which ran along what today is Route 110 and has now been replaced by the S1 bus. Today the closest rail line is the LIRR's Main Line to Ronkonkoma and Greenport, but the closest station on that line is Pinelawn which only sees weekend service. Therefore, Huntington is the closest station with full service.

Demographics

In the census of 2000, there were 14,533 people, 4,930 households, and 3,993 families residing in the CDP. The population density was 1,284.00 per square mile (495.7/km2). The population was 18,985 at the 2010 census. 

As of the 2020 census the population was 19,284 with 6,883 households. The population density was 1,599.60 per square mile (495.7/km2). There were 5,141 housing units at an average density of 454.2/sq mi (175.3/km2). The racial makeup of the CDP was 84.6% White (82.6% White Non-hispanic), 7.4% Asian, 3% Black, 0% Native American, 0.1% Pacific Islander, 1.04% from other races, and 4.4% from two or more races. Hispanic or Latino of any race were 4.4.% of the population.

In 2000, there were 4,930 households, out of which 38.1% had children under the age of 18 living with them, 72.2% were married couples living together, 6.6% had a female householder with no husband present, and 19.0% were non-families. 15.7% of all households were made up of individuals, and 6.8% had someone living alone who was 65 years of age or older. The average household size was 2.88 and the average family size was 3.23.

In the CDP, the population was spread out, with 25.5% under the age of 18, 5.3% from 18 to 24, 29.1% from 25 to 44, 26.0% from 45 to 64, and 14.1% who were 65 years of age or older. The median age was 39 years. For every 100 females, there were 94.6 males. For every 100 females age 18 and over, there were 91.9 males.

In 2000, the median income for a household in the CDP was $132,527, and the median income for a family was $170,881. Males had a median income of $142,972 versus $115,495 for females. The per capita income for the CDP was $125,053. About 3.0% of families and 4.0% of the population were below the poverty line, including 5.2% of those under age 18 and 3.2% of those age 65 or over. The median house price in Melville  is about $900,000.

Education 
Half Hollow Hills Central School District and South Huntington Union Free School District serve Melville. The Katharine Gibbs School – Melville serves the post-school population with certificates and associate degrees.

Economy 

Melville and Happauge are the two primary business centers of Suffolk County, which is home to almost one and a half million people. Melville still is home to many U.S. headquarters of a number of national and international corporations, including Canon USA, Chyron Corporation, Leviton, MSC Industrial Direct, Nikon USA, the medical and dental supply distributor Henry Schein, Bouchard Transportation, and Verint Systems. In addition, significant operations of Manhattan-based The Estée Lauder Companies are conducted there. Melville was also the host of operations for many Fortune 500 companies, where headquarters and many other corporate and industrial centers were once found on or near Route 110, which runs north to south through Huntington, Melville, Farmingdale, North Amityville, and Amityville. In early 2013, Canon Inc. moved into its new regional headquarters for North and South America in Melvillea $500-million  glass structure near Exit 49 of the Long Island Expressway on the  site of a former pumpkin farm. About 1,500 workers were expected to move from Canon's Lake Success offices. The company chose Melville over other tri-state area locations because the employees "didn't want to leave the area".

Firms that have disappeared, that were once headquartered here are OSI Pharmaceuticals, which was bought by Astellas Pharma of Japan, Allion Healthcare, which was acquired by a private equity firm, Hain Celestial, which moved to Lake Success in Nassau County, Arrow Electronics relocated their headquarters to Centennial, Colorado in 2011 and the global staffing giant, and The Adecco Group, which in 2014 moved their U.S. headquarters to Jacksonville, Florida. Other firms to leave include First Data, Olympus America Inc., the U.S. subsidiary of Olympus Corporation, who moved in 2006 to Center Valley, Pennsylvania, and the national pizza chain Sbarro, which went into bankruptcy and reemerged in 2014, relocating to Columbus, Ohio. Around 2002, Swiss International Air Lines's North American headquarters moved from Melville to Uniondale in the town of Hempstead. The facility, the former Swissair North American headquarter site, was completed in 1995. Swissair intended to own, instead of lease, its headquarters site. It enlisted architect Richard Meier to design the Melville facility.  The building is now owned by Damianos Realty Group, LLC, a Long Island-based real estate company. Melville was also the global headquarters of Gentiva Health Services from its 1999 founding until its 2006 relocation to Atlanta.

Media
The Long Island newspaper Newsday is published in Melville.

The independent television station WLNY-TV operates a studio in Melville where it had been based before being purchased by CBS and moved to the network's Manhattan facility.

Fire protection 
The Melville community is protected by the Melville Volunteer Fire Department. Established in 1947, they are capable of handling all emergencies including any type of fire, heavy rescue (extrications), emergency ambulances, haz-mat and other related tasks. The fire department responds to more than 3,500 alarms in a year and provides protection 24hrs a day, 7 days a week, with an annual budget of $1.5 million.

References

External links

 Newsday article on Melville, NY
 Pictures from Melville's past

Huntington, New York
Census-designated places in New York (state)
Census-designated places in Suffolk County, New York
Hamlets in New York (state)
Hamlets in Suffolk County, New York